Parargidia is a genus of moths of the family Erebidae. The genus was erected by George Hampson in 1926.

Species
Parargidia octophora Felder, 1874
Parargidia vacillans (Walker, 1858) Brazil (Amazonas)

References

Calpinae